Fifth power may refer to:

Fifth power (algebra), the result of multiplying five instances of a number together
Fifth power (politics), a political term
The 5th Power, a 1978 album by Lester Bowie
The Fifth Power (film), a 1962 film by Alberto Pieralisi